Michael Osborn, FRCPath is the president of the Royal College of Pathologists since November 2020 He received his medical degree from Guy's & St Thomas' Hospitals in London in 1995. In 2000, he became a member of the Royal College of Surgeons, and in 2004, he was named a Fellow of the Royal College of Pathologists. He was hired as a consultant in 2004 with a focus on postmortems, gastrointestinal pathology, and instructing undergraduate students. He is the department head at Imperial College Healthcare NHS Trust in London and a consultant histopathologist for North West London Pathology. He contributed to the COVID-19 postmortem site for the college and wrote many guide materials.

Select publications

References 

Living people
British pathologists
20th-century English medical doctors
Fellows of the Royal College of Pathologists
Fellows of the Royal College of Surgeons
Year of birth missing (living people)
Place of birth missing (living people)